Juan Pablo Reyes (born August 2, 1985) is an Ecuadorian footballer who currently plays for Florida Tropics SC in the Major Arena Soccer League.

Career

Youth and Amateur
Reyes grew up in Florida, attending William R. Boone High School where he was an All State soccer player, and playing club soccer for the Ajax American soccer club. Reyes did not play college soccer, but did play in the USL Premier Development League for the Cocoa Expos in 2006 and Central Florida Kraze in 2007.

Professional
Reyes spent the 2007-2008 indoor season with the Orlando Sharks of the second Major Indoor Soccer League.  On April 16, 2008, the Rochester Rhinos of the USL First Division announced the signing of Reyes. Bill Sedgewick, a former Rhinos player, recommended Reyes to the Rhinos coaching staff.

After a year out of the competitive game in 2009, Reyes returned to play for Central Florida Kraze in the PDL in 2010, making his first appearance of the season on June 24 against the Bradenton Academics.

References

External links
 Florida Tropics SC player profile

1985 births
Living people
Sportspeople from Guayaquil
Association football defenders
Ecuadorian footballers
Ecuadorian expatriate footballers
Rochester New York FC players
Cocoa Expos players
Orlando City U-23 players
Orlando Sharks players
Major Indoor Soccer League (2001–2008) players
USL League Two players
USL First Division players
Major Arena Soccer League players
Tampa Marauders players
Florida Tropics SC players
Rockford Rampage players
Lakeland Tropics players
United Premier Soccer League players
National Premier Soccer League players
Major Arena Soccer League coaches
United Premier Soccer League coaches
American soccer coaches
Association football player-managers
National Premier Soccer League coaches